Panaitescu is a Romanian surname. Notable people with the surname include:

Perpessicius, the pen name of Dumitru S. Panaitescu
Petre P. Panaitescu (1900–1967), Romanian literary historian

Romanian-language surnames
Patronymic surnames